William Graves Sharp (March 14, 1859 – November 17, 1922) was an American lawyer, manufacturer, three-term congressman, and diplomat.

Biography
Sharp was born in Mount Gilead, Ohio on March 14, 1859.

He moved to Elyria, Ohio with his mother and her parents, occupying the Starr-Worthington home on Washington Avenue.

Education and early career
He graduated LL.B. from the Law Department of the University of Michigan in 1881 and then practiced law in Elyria.  He also engaged in the manufacture of charcoal, pig iron, and chemicals.  From 1885–88 he was prosecuting attorney of Lorain County, Ohio.

Political career
He was a Democratic presidential elector in 1892, a Democratic candidate for Congress in 1900, and a member of the Sixty-first to the Sixty-third Congresses (1909–15), but resigned in 1914 to become Ambassador to France by appointment of President Wilson.  He served until April 14, 1919, then returned to Elyria, Ohio, and engaged in literary pursuits.

Sharp was known as the Father of Air Mail due to his vision of using aircraft for postal delivery. He crafted legislation for this goal which was eventually successful in being passed.

He was one of two Elyrians to have served in Congress and also one of two Lorain Countians (Myron T. Herrick) to have served as Ambassador to France during the early 20th century.

Death and legacy 
He died on November 17, 1922 in Elyria, Ohio and was interred in Ridgelawn Cemetery.

The family's Elyria home was purchased in 1945 by the Washington Avenue Christian Church (Disciples of Christ) congregation which was relocating at that time from Elyria's Second Street. The Sharp home was incorporated into the church's new building, dedicated in 1951. Many of the mansion’s interior architectural details–including marble fireplaces, decorative ceiling mouldings, plaster reliefs on the parlor walls, and a beautiful grand staircase–remain.

Through the efforts of the Elyria Historical Association, Lorain County Historical Society, Ohio History Connection, and Washington Avenue Christian Church, an historical marker (Lorain County's 7th and Lorain County's 35th) was unveiled on the Washington Avenue property on September 3, 2020 with approximately 50 people present. Remarks at the unveiling were presented by the Honorable Frank Whitfield, Mayor of the City of Elyria, Mr. Bill Bird, President of the Elyria Historical Association, Ms. Kerri Broome, Executive Director of the Lorain County Historical Society, and the Rev. Nathan A. Russell, Senior Pastor.

Sources

Ambassadors of the United States to France
People from Mount Gilead, Ohio
People from Elyria, Ohio
Ohio lawyers
University of Michigan Law School alumni
County district attorneys in Ohio
1859 births
1922 deaths
1892 United States presidential electors
19th-century American lawyers
Democratic Party members of the United States House of Representatives from Ohio